Chanakya (Kannada: ಚಾಣಕ್ಯ) is a 1984 Indian Kannada film, directed by V. Somashekhar and produced by M. D. Sundar. The film stars Vishnuvardhan, Madhavi, Vajramuni and Shivaram. The film had musical score by Chellapilla Satyam.

Cast

Vishnuvardhan
Madhavi
Vajramuni
Shivaram
Mukhyamantri Chandru
Sudarshan
Lohithaswa
Srinivasa Murthy
Shivaprakash
Rathnakar
B. K. Shankar
Tomato Somu
Master Chethan
Hanumanthachar
Brahmavar
V. L. Acharya
Shashikumar
Jaggu
Leelavathi
Shanthamma
Devishree
Lalitha
Shashikala
Roopa Chakravarthy

References

External links
 
 

1984 films
1980s Kannada-language films
Films scored by Satyam (composer)
Films directed by V. Somashekhar